F.A.L.T.U (short for Fakirchand and Lakirchand Trust University) is a 2011 Indian Hindi-language comedy film directed by Remo D'Souza and produced by Vashu Bhagnani, under the banner Puja Entertainment (India) Ltd. Its plot is heavily borrowed from the 2006 Hollywood comedy, Accepted.

It stars Jackky Bhagnani, Puja Gupta, Chandan Roy Sanyal, Angad Bedi, Riteish Deshmukh and Arshad Warsi in the lead role, While Akbar Khan and Darshan Jariwala appear in supporting roles. The film was released on 1 April 2011 and was recorded average at the box office.

Plot 

A group of friends, Ritesh (Jackky), Nanj (Angad), and Puja (Puja), all receive extremely bad marks in their exams. One of their close friends, Vishnu (Chandan), has passed with top marks under the pressure of his father, and has enrolled in the top high school of India.

To make their parents happy and proud, the four friends create a fake university titled "Fakirchand and Lakirchand Trust University" (F.A.L.T.U) with the assistance of Ritesh's childhood friend Google (Arshad Warsi). Things take a turn for the worse when the parents would like to see F.A.L.T.U. To make things go right, Ritesh and Google hire someone, Bajirao (Riteish), to act as the principal for one day. However, after the parents's visit, a bunch of kids apply for F.A.L.T.U, believing it to be a real university. Unable to send them back, the trio, along with Vishnu, Google and Bajirao, turn F.A.L.T.U into an official trust university. Soon enough, the government files a case against every student/member of F.A.L.T.U for creating a fake college. Now the group of friends must fight for their rights, and keep F.A.L.T.U as a university to give the kids an education. Near the end there is a song competition into which the trio, along with the college, sneak. As Vishnu's father is the one who had filed the case against them, it comes as something of a shock that, when the members of F.A.L.T.U finish their performance, he stands up and claps. (He did not know which college was performing because it was very dark.) The education minister asks Ritesh about F.A.L.T.U and what it was, in response to which Ritesh makes a speech about the education system and how F.A.L.T.U fixes it. In the end, the college is granted a license to function for three years as an official college, and Vishnu's father finally accepts the college along with him.

Cast 

 Arshad Warsi as Google Chand
 Ritesh Deshmukh as "Principal" Bajirao
 Jackky Bhagnani as Ritesh Virani
 Puja Gupta as Puja Nigam
 Chandan Roy Sanyal as Vishnu Vardhan
 Angad Bedi as Niranjan "Nanj" Nair
 Boman Irani as Principal Sharma (special appearance)
 Darshan Jariwala as Jeevanlal
 Akbar Khan as Mr. Vardhan
 Mahesh Thakur as Mr. Nigam
 Vijay Kashyap as Mr. Nair
 Vivek Vaswani as Examiner
 Himani Shivpuri as herself/ Contest Judge
 Mithun Chakraborty as himself/Contest Judge (special appearance)
 Remo D'Souza as himself/Content Judge (special appearance)

Inspiration 

This film was a remake of the 2006 United States movie Accepted, which starred Justin Long and was directed by Steve Pink.

Soundtrack 

The soundtrack is composed by Sachin–Jigar with lyrics penned by Sameer.

Accolades

References

External links
 

2010s Hindi-language films
2011 comedy films
Indian remakes of American films
2011 directorial debut films
2011 films
Films directed by Remo D'Souza